ADAC is an initialism which means any of the following:
 Aboriginal Drug and Alcohol Council of South Australia
 Abu Dhabi Airports Company (ADAC)
 Acting Deputy Assistant Commissioner
 Allgemeiner Deutscher Automobil-Club e.V. the German Auto club
 ADAC GT Masters a grand tourer-based auto racing series